Giselle Estefanía Juárez (born 5 May 1991) is an Argentine field hockey player. At the 2014 Hockey World Cup, she competed for the Argentina women's national field hockey team in her first major international tournament.

References

Living people
Las Leonas players
Argentine female field hockey players
1991 births
South American Games gold medalists for Argentina
South American Games medalists in field hockey
Competitors at the 2014 South American Games
Sportspeople from Buenos Aires Province
20th-century Argentine women
21st-century Argentine women